San Agustin, officially the Municipality of San Agustin, is a 3rd class municipality in the province of Isabela, Philippines. According to the 2020 census, it has a population of 22,096 people.

History
Founded by Agustin Daguro Agpaoa in 1949, by virtue of Executive Order No. 259 dated September 28, 1949 issued by President Elpidio Quirino. The mayor named the new LGU after his first name but on official records, it was named after the patron of the new town. There are seven towns in Isabela named after its founders but used prefix "San" (Saint) to remove the idea of being self-serving.

In the old days, the present site of San Agustin, Isabela was a hinterland inhabited by headhunting Ilongots and some scattered bands of Aetas locally known as "Pogot". It was then a part of the municipality of Echague. From this historic town sailed forth a band of intrepid pioneers led by Juan Gumpal, Antonio Pintang, and Vicente Taguiam. They penetrated the wilderness and explored the rich valleys along both sides of the Cagayan River. They put up scattered settlements which were often plagued by malaria, and the marauding Ilongots and Pogots but the brave pioneers stayed put and in the end they were able to befriend Ilongots and Aetas and at the same time they were able to lick malaria. Not long after the scattered settlements grew into sitios and one of them was Lakay-lakay (named after the creek) on the western side of the Cagayan River. The place is now "Masaya Centro", the seat of the municipal government of San Agustin.

When Jones was organized into an independent municipality in 1921, 30 barrios were separated from the municipality of Echague and one of them was Masaya. Because all the barrios of Jones prospered beyond the inhabitants' expectations and since there were no good roads connecting the barrios at that time, the people of Masaya and adjoining barrios petitioned the President of the Philippines to organize the barrios into a regular town.

In 1959, the barrio of Uldogan was renamed Laoag.

It is the home of the "Nuang Festival" the annual celebration in honor of the sturdy carabao and in recognition of the highly successful Carabao Upgrading Program of the local government, through the Office of the Municipal Agriculturist and its cooperating agencies and stakeholders. The program was commenced in 1993 by then Mayor Jesus M. Silorio. This was continued under the successive administrations of Mayor Virgilio A. Padilla and Mayor Operaflor A. Manuel.  Under the latter's leadership, the Nuang Festival was started.

Mayor Cesar Agonoy Mondala, won the 2016 Elections with the support of 1 & 1/2 barangay Captain out of 23 Barangay.

Geography

Barangays
San Agustin is politically subdivided into barangays. These barangays are headed by elected officials: Barangay Captain, Barangay Council, whose members are called Barangay Councilors. All are elected every three years.

Climate

Demographics

Economy

Government

Local government
The municipality is governed by a mayor designated as its local chief executive and by a municipal council as its legislative body in accordance with the Local Government Code. The mayor, vice mayor, and the councilors are elected directly by the people through an election which is being held every three years.

Elected officials

Congress representation
San Agustin, belonging to the fourth legislative district of the province of Isabela, currently represented by Hon. Alyssa Sheena P. Tan.

Education
The Schools Division of Isabela governs the town's public education system. The division office is a field office of the DepEd in Cagayan Valley region. The office governs the public and private elementary and public and private high schools throughout the municipality.

References

External links
 Municipal Profile at the National Competitiveness Council of the Philippines
san Agustin at the Isabela Government Website
Local Governance Performance Management System
[ Philippine Standard Geographic Code]
Philippine Census Information
Municipality of San Agustin

Municipalities of Isabela (province)
Establishments by Philippine executive order